Aketza Peña Iza (born 4 March 1981) is a Spanish former professional road bicycle racer, who rode professionally between 2004 and 2007, entirely for UCI ProTeam .

Doping
During the 2007 Giro d'Italia, it was revealed he had tested positive for nandrolone at the Giro del Trentino, and had to leave the race.

See also
 List of doping cases in cycling

External links 
Profile at Euskaltel-Euskadi official website 

Cyclists from the Basque Country (autonomous community)
Spanish male cyclists
1981 births
Living people
Doping cases in cycling
Spanish sportspeople in doping cases
People from Enkarterri
Sportspeople from Biscay